Karen Simensen married name Klæboe (26 August 1907, in Oslo – 13 July 1996, in Oslo) was a Norwegian figure skater. She won a bronze medal at the 1927 World Figure Skating Championships, and competed at the 1928 Summer Olympics where she placed sixteenth.

Results

References

External links

1907 births
1996 deaths
Sportspeople from Oslo
Norwegian female single skaters
World Figure Skating Championships medalists
Figure skaters at the 1928 Winter Olympics
Olympic figure skaters of Norway
20th-century Norwegian women